The 2020 New Zealand Grand Prix event for open wheel racing cars was held at Manfeild: Circuit Chris Amon near Feilding on 16 February 2020. It was the sixty-fifth New Zealand Grand Prix and fielded Toyota Racing Series cars. The event also served as the third race of the fifth round of the 2020 Toyota Racing Series, the final race of the series. The race was won by Igor Fraga, who also won the Toyota Racing Series championship in the process.

Report

Qualifying 

Notes
1. – Tsunoda was given a six-place penalty for a practice start infringement.

Race

References

New Zealand Grand Prix
New Zealand Grand Prix
New Zealand Grand Prix